Franklin E. Weimer (February 21, 1923–February 5, 2012) was an American politician who served as a Republican member of the Kansas House of Representatives from 1987 to 1992. He represented the 30th District and lived in Lenexa, Kansas. He was succeeded by fellow Republican Gary Haulmark.

References

1923 births
2012 deaths
Republican Party members of the Kansas House of Representatives
20th-century American politicians
People from Lenexa, Kansas